Russian Youth Movement "Oborona" (Rossiyskoye molodozhnoye dvizheniye «Oborona») (Russian for "Defense") is a non-partisan civic youth movement in Russia. Its name means "Defense [from]" in Russian and others. The movement was established in 2005 and has no leader or centralized structure. Instead, it is based on the network principle and mostly horizontal relations.

The movement opposes what they call an authoritarian vector of Russian policy. They claim that president Vladimir Putin destroys democracy institutions and aims to establish an authoritarian police state in Russia. The movement espouses nonviolent resistance to the authorities.

The Moscow branch of Oborona has several hundred activists. The movement also has branches in 25 Russian cities.

The movement has been widely inspired by the Orange Revolution in Ukraine in 2004 and especially the Ukrainian youth organizations Pora! and Znayu! as well as by Belarus Zubr.

One of this organization leaders, Oleg Kozlovsky has been arrested, and, according to several oppositional sites illegally sent as a private conscript to the Russian Army. Eight other members of the movement who tried to arrange demonstrations in support of Kozlovsky have been arrested as well, one of them daughter of writer and radio host Victor Shenderovich. One of arrested was severely beaten and taken to a hospital.

Leadership of "Oborona" believed that Kozlovsky has been arrested for publishing in LiveJournal photos of governmental special forces officers who recently killed activist of Other Russia Yuriy Chervochkin. However Oleg Kozlovsky himself said that he was conscripted in order to isolate him from his colleagues in Oborona for a period of presidential elections. Indeed, he was released from the Army on March 4, 2008, two days after the elections. The military officials confirmed that his draft had been illegal.

Symbolism
During the 20th century, the image of a clenched fist, a symbol and gesture of resistance and unity was used by many movements, mostly of the left sense, such as: anarchists, anti-fascists, human rights activists, left-wing students, democrats, trade union movements, fighters for Indian rights, Black Panthers, green. All these people were united by the values of freedom and justice (in their understanding), the rejection of political reality and the readiness to defend their rights in practice.

Structure
Oborona has a network structure in which each regional organization retains significant autonomy, and horizontal links prevail over vertical ones. The largest regional organizations are managed by coordinating councils, others by coordinators.

References

Further reading

External links
Oborona Web site 
Putin's Gulag Stability by Oleg Kozlovsky, Washington Post, May 19, 2008
Romantics Learn to Use Their Fists
Hooray! Here Comes Oborona!
Interview with Oleg Kozlovsky by Grigory Pasko
Oleg Kozlovsky's English language blog

Nonviolent resistance movements
Political organizations based in Russia
Russian democracy movements
Russian political activists
Youth organizations based in Russia
2005 establishments in Russia
Political parties established in 2005
Opposition to Vladimir Putin